Nekogigi (Coreobagrus ichikawai) is a species of bagrid catfish endemic to Japan where it is only found in Mie Prefecture on Honshu.  It occurs in streams and can grow to a length of 10.8 cm.

Sources

External links
Watanabe, K. (1994). Growth, maturity, and population structure of the bagrid catfish, Pseudobagrus ichikawai, in the Tagiri River, Mie Prefecture, Japan. Japan J Ichthyol 41(1) 15–22.

Bagridae
Freshwater fish of Japan
Fish described in 1957
Taxonomy articles created by Polbot
Taxobox binomials not recognized by IUCN